The Reverend Caspar Castner (October 7, 1655– November 9, 1709) was a Jesuit missionary to the Qing Empire.

Life
Caspar Castner was born in Munich, Bavaria, on October 7, 1655.

He entered the Society of Jesus ("Jesuits") on September 17, 1681, and studied theology at Ingolstadt. He finished his studies there on 22 March 1694. For a short time, he taught logic at the gymnasium in Ratisbon. Afterwards, he devoted himself to the work of missions and sailed in 1696 for China at the head of a company of brother Jesuits from Portugal and Genoa. In China, where he was known as Pang Jiabin, he laboured with great success on Shangchuan Island and in the city of Foshan, then a competitor of Guangzhou. In 1702 he went with Father François Noël to Lisbon and Rome in order, as representative of the bishops of Nanjing and Macao, to argue against the Bishop of Fujian's reopening of the Chinese Rites controversy. In 1706 he returned to China, bringing with him a number of missionaries.

He died in Beijing, China, on November 9, 1709. He was buried in the Jesuits' Zhalan Cemetery in Beijing.

Works
Besides a number of elaborate reports on the question of Chinese Rites which he drew up with the aid of Father Noel, Father Castner also wrote an interesting but rare little work called "Relatio Sepulturæ Magno Orientis Apostolo S. Francisco Xaviero erectæ in Insula Sanciano MDCC." It is an exact description of the island where from  March 19 to  June 2, 1700, he had been engaged in erecting, at the command of his superiors, a memorial over the grave of St. Francis Xavier. The book was accompanied by a good map. One of the few copies printed in China is in the so-called "Orban'sche Sammlung" of the library of the University of Munich. A translation was published by Father Joseph Stöcklein in his "Welt-Bott" (Augsburg, 1729), No. 309. The title-page and map are reproduced in the work of Henri Cordier, "L'imprimerie sino-européenne en chine" (Paris, 1901), 11-15.

Legacy
Besides his apostolic work, Father Castner worked in the sciences of navigation, astronomy, and cartography. He called the attention of the Portuguese Government to the fact that the voyage to Macau would be much shorter if the vessels followed a direct course from the Cape of Good Hope by the way of the Sunda Islands, avoiding Mozambique and Goa, and the result showed that he was right. He did excellent work in the mapping of the Chinese Empire, and had so great a reputation as a mathematician that he was made president of the mathematical tribunal and instructor of the heir to the throne.

References

1655 births
17th-century German Jesuits
Jesuit missionaries in China
Roman Catholic missionaries in China
1709 deaths
German Roman Catholic missionaries
German expatriates in China